Giovanni Goran Rodríguez Rivero (born 25 August 1998), sometimes known simply as Giovanni, is a Spanish footballer who plays for UD Lanzarote as a forward.

Club career
Born in Candelaria, Tenerife, Canary Islands, Rodríguez joined CD Tenerife's youth setup in 2009, aged 11. He made his senior debut with the reserves on 23 December 2015, starting in a 0–1 Tercera División away loss against rivals UD Las Palmas Atlético.

On 3 January 2016 Rodríguez scored his first senior goals, netting a brace in a 4–1 home rout of CD El Cotillo. On 20 November he made his professional debut, coming on as a late substitute for goalscorer Amath Ndiaye in a 2–1 home win against UCAM Murcia CF in the Segunda División championship.

On 11 January 2019, after falling out of favour at Tenerife, Rodríguezjoined Gibraltar Premier Division side Lincoln Red Imps on loan for the remainder of the season. He scored a hat-trick on his debut for the Imps as his side ran out 5-1 winners against rivals Gibraltar United.

Upon returning, Rodríguez was assigned back to the B-side, but after being sparingly used, he was loaned to fellow fourth division side CD Atlético Paso for the remainder of the season in December 2019.

References

External links
Tenerife official profile  

1998 births
Living people
People from Tenerife
Sportspeople from the Province of Santa Cruz de Tenerife
Spanish footballers
Association football forwards
Segunda División players
Tercera División players
CD Tenerife B players
CD Tenerife players
Gibraltar Premier Division players
Lincoln Red Imps F.C. players
Spanish expatriate footballers
Spanish expatriate sportspeople in Gibraltar
Expatriate footballers in Gibraltar